China Heilan Group is a China-based garment and textile manufacturing company and consumer-orientated holding group. The group focuses on commercial investments in clothing retail, finance, cultural tourism, energy and commercial real estate. In was founded in 1988 and is headquartered in Jiangyin. In 2020, the group was listed as the fourth largest taxpayer in Wuxi.

The clothing arm of Heilan Group developed from Heilan Home, also known as HLA, one of China's largest clothing companies with revenues of RMB 20 billion in 2021.
In 2022, the corporate website listed the group's revenues at RMB 1250 billion with over 60,000 employees.

Company history and prospects 
In 1988, Zhou Jianping opened a fabric textile factory in Jiangyin, Wuxi. The company started with textile manufacturing, built up with fine spinning and garments. The Heilan Group was founded in 1991.

Business status of the company

Heilan Home and Clothing 
The clothing industry is the core interest of the Heilan Group. So far, the clothing brands of the Heilan Group include: Heilan Home, also known as HLA, Sancanal, Eichitoo and HLA Jeans.

HLA Brand Management was founded in 2002 in the Yangtze River Delta. On April 11, 2014, it was reorganized for listing on the stock market and became a leading stock in the Chinese clothing industry.

Sancanal targets customized business wear with an annual production capacity of 3 million western-style suits and 8 million shirts. It is one of China's largest scale clothes manufacturing enterprises. Eichitoo targets urban females. By the end of June 2016, it has expanded to 827 stores in China.

Other product categories in Heilan Home include cosmetics, table and kitchenware, bedding, nursing materials, travel accessories, household supplies and furniture.

Heilan Group Investments 
Since 2000, Heilan Group has invested in more than 30 external projects. Heilan holds large shares in many businesses including:

Huatai Securities Company Limited

China Guangfa Bank

Bank of Jiangsu

Jiangyin Rural Commercial Bank

Nanchang Commercial Bank

Leshan City Commercial Bank

Shandong Longlive Bio-technology

Jiangsu AkcomeScience & Technology

Suzhou Supply Chain Technology

Shandong Century Jinbang Science-Education and Culture

Beijing Baofeng Technology

Shanghai Hongyi Venture Capital Investment

Xinjiang ZhongmaiXinrui Equity Investment Partnership

Heilan Real Estate 
Mambat Plaza is Heilan Group's flagship project in the commercial property market. The gross floor area is about 260 thousand square meters, of which around 150 thousand square meters are above ground and 110 thousand square meters underground. About 120 thousand square meters of space is for retail, and another 60 thousand square meters are for SOHO offices and Grade A office buildings.

As the first industrial internship base of Phoenix Satellite Television in Chinese Mainland, Heilan Industrial Park is evaluated by National Tourism Administration as a demonstration site for national industrial tourism.
 In 2015, Heilan Group ranked 202nd on the List of Top 500 Chinese Enterprises.
 In 2015, Heilan Group ranked 36th on the List of Top 500 Private Enterprises in China.
 In November, 2016, HLA gained the title of Best listed Chinese company of the year 2016.
 In 2016, holding a brand value of 11 billion Yuan, HLA was on the 2016 Hurun Brand List and ranked first in China's clothing industry.
 In 2016, on the two lists of top 100 enterprises in Chinese clothing industry separately for sales volume and profit, Heilan Group ranked first on both.
 In 2016, with total sales income of RMB 93.3 billion and taxes and profits of RMB 8 billion, the Group topped the Taxpayer List in Wuxi.
 In 2016, with total sales income reaching RMB 93.3 billion, Heilan Group ranked 166th on the List of Top 500 Chinese Enterprises, and 31st on the List of Top 500 Private Enterprises in China.

References 

Clothing brands
Chinese brands
Online companies of China